Uşakpınarı is a village in Silifke district of Mersin Province, Turkey. It is situated on the southern slopes of the Taurus Mountains. The population of Uşakpınarı was 224 as of 2012. The major economic activities of the village are farming and animal breeding.

References

Villages in Silifke District